Central is a station on the Chicago Transit Authority's 'L' system and is located at 350 North Central Avenue in the Austin neighborhood on Chicago's West side.

History
The original Central station was built as part of an extension of the Lake Street Elevated Railroad that opened on April 15, 1899. The structure, consisting of a single island platform, was originally at grade, but was relocated onto an embankment in 1962 to allow Central Avenue to pass underneath. The Parkside Avenue auxiliary entrance closed on January 15, 1973. During the 1994–1996 Green Line rehabilitation, Central was repainted and an elevator was added for accessibility.

Despite the identical name, it is geographically distant from Central station on the Purple Line.

Location
The station address is 350 North Central Avenue and it is situated between the Laramie and Austin stations on the Green Line, which runs from Harlem/Lake and to Ashland/63rd and Cottage Grove. The station is located at the intersection of Central Avenue and Corcoran Place in the Austin neighborhood on Chicago's West Side.

Bus connections
CTA
  85 Central

Notes and references

Notes

References

External links

 Central (Lake Street Line) Station Page
Parkside Avenue closed entrance from Google Maps Street View
Central Avenue entrance from Google Maps Street View

CTA Green Line stations
Railway stations in the United States opened in 1899